The 2016 IIFA Awards, officially known as the 17th International Indian Film Academy Awards ceremony, presented by the International Indian Film Academy honouring the best Hindi films of 2015, took place on 25 June 2016.  The official ceremony took place on 25 June 2016 in IFEMA, Madrid, Spain. The nominations were announced on 26 May 2016.

Bajirao Mastani led the ceremony with 18 nominations, and won a leading 13 awards, including Best Director (for Sanjay Leela Bhansali), Best Actor (for Ranveer Singh) and Best Supporting Actress (for Priyanka Chopra).

Deepika Padukone received dual nominations for Best Actress for her performances in Bajirao Mastani and Piku, winning for the latter.

Winners and nominees

Popular awards

Special awards

 Prasad

Musical awards

Technical awards

See also

International Indian Film Academy Awards
Bollywood
Cinema of India

References

External links
The Nominees 2016

IIfa Awards
IIFA awards